Sandnes Sparebank is a Norwegian savings bank, headquartered in Sandnes, Norway. The banks main market
is Rogaland. The bank was established in 1875 and was listed on the Oslo Stock Exchange in 1995.

References

Banks of Norway
Companies based in Rogaland
Banks established in 1875
Companies listed on the Oslo Stock Exchange